Semeno-Makarovo (Semen-Makar) is a rural locality (a selo) in Yermekeyevsky Selsoviet, Yermekeyevsky District, Bashkortostan, Russia. The population was 332 as of 2010. There are 4 streets.

Geography 
Semeno-Makarovo is located 12 km northeast of Yermekeyevo (the district's administrative centre) by road. Vasilyevka is the nearest rural locality.

References 

Rural localities in Yermekeyevsky District